This is a list of genera in the green algae class Mamiellophyceae, sub-divided by order and family.  The list is based on the data available in AlgaeBase, the Integrated Taxonomic Information System (ITIS), the National Center for Biotechnology Information taxonomic database (NCBI), and other taxonomic databases.

Order Dolichomastigales 
 Family Crustomastigaceae
 Crustomastix

 Family Dolichomastigaceae
 Dolichomastix

Order Mamiellales 
 Family Bathycoccaceae
 Bathycoccus
 Ostreococcus

 Family Mamiellaceae
 Mamiella
 Mantoniella
 Micromonas

Order Monomastigales 
 Family Monomastigaceae
 Monomastix

References

External links 

 
 
  
 

 
Mamiellophyceae genera
Mamiellophyceae
Mamiellophyceae